The men's field hockey tournament at the 1992 Summer Olympics was the 17th edition of the field hockey event for men at the Summer Olympic Games. It was held over a fourteen-day period beginning on 26 July, and culminating with the medal finals on 8 August. All games were played at the Estadi Olímpic de Terrassa in Terrassa, Spain, located 30 kilometers from Barcelona.

Germany won the gold medal for the second time after defeating Australia 2–1 in the final. Pakistan won the bronze medal by defeating the Netherlands 4–3.

Qualification

Squads

Umpires

Tarlok Bhullar (IND)
Santiago Deo (ESP)
Adriano de Vecchi (ITA)
Jose Gortazar (ESP)
M Iqbal Bali (PAK)
Guillaume Langle (FRA)
Graham Nash (GBR)
Don Prior (AUS)
Alain Renaud (FRA)
Eduardo Ruiz (ARG)
Kiyoshi Sana (JPN)
Claude Seidler (GER)
Nikolai Stepanov (URS)
Christopher Todd (GBR)
Patrick van Beneden (BEL)
Peter von Reth (NED)
Alan Waterman (CAN)
Richard Wolter (GER)

Preliminary round

Group A

Group B

Classification round

Ninth to twelfth place classification

9–12th place semi-finals

11th place game

Ninth place game

Fifth to eighth place classification

5–8th place semi-finals

Seventh place game

Fifth place game

Medal round

Semi-finals

Bronze medal match

Gold medal match

Statistics

Final standings

Goalscorers

References

External links

Official website

Men
Men's events at the 1992 Summer Olympics